Pope John Paul II declared 523 individuals venerable, based on the recognition of their heroic virtues from 1978 to 2005.

1978

December 1, 1978
August Czartoryski (1858–1893)
Josephine Bakhita (1869–1947)
Leonie Aviat (1844–1914)

1979

May 10, 1979
Charles of Mount Argus (1821–1893)
Viktrizius Weiss (1842–1924)

July 13, 1979
Jeanne Jugan (1792–1879)
Marie Rose Durocher (1811–1849)

1980

April 29, 1980
Brigida Morello Zancano (1610–1679)
Joseph Amand Passerat (1772–1858)
Franciszka Siedliska (1842–1902)

October 11, 1980
Domingo Iturrate (1901–1927)
Raphael Kalinowski (1835–1907)

1981

January 31, 1981
Alodie-Virginie Paradis (1840–1912)
Pedro Urocca (1583–1657)

March 30, 1981
María Catalina Irigoyen Echegaray (1848–1918)

May 4, 1981
Maria Gabriella Sagheddu (1914–1939)

November 27, 1981
Galileo Nicolini (1882–1897)
Luigi Balbiano (1812–1884)
Mariam Baouardy (1846–1878)
Mercedes de Jesús Molina (1828–1883)
Rafael Guízar Valencia (1878–1938)

1982

February 11, 1982
Celine Borzecka (1833–1913)
Francisco Gárate Aranguren (1857–1929)
Guido Maria Conforti (1865–1931)
Maria Clotilde Adelaide Saveria di Borbone (1759–1802)
Rafqa Pietra Choboq Ar-Rayès (1832–1914)

April 2, 1982
Angela Truszkowska (1825–1899)
Gesualdo Melacrino (1725–1803)
Giacomo Cusmano (1834–1888)

May 11, 1982
Benedict Menni (1841–1912)
Jurgis Matulaitis-Matulevičius (1871–1927)

July 12, 1982
Elizabeth of the Trinity (1880–1906)
Isidore De Loor (1881–1916)
Josep Manyanet i Vives (1833–1901)
Maria Caterina Troiani (1813–1887)
Teresa Valsé Pantellini (1878–1907)

December 17, 1982
Hedwig Borzecka (1863–1907)
Maria Crocifissa Constantini (1713–1787)

1983

January 13, 1983
Daniel Brottier (1876–1936)
Karolina Gerhardinger (1797–1879)
Pauline Mallinckrodt (1817–1881)

March 21, 1983
Leo Dupont (1797–1876)
Nicolas Barré (1621–1686)
Pius of Saint Aloysius (1868–1889)

May 14, 1983
Étienne Pernet (1824–1899)
Hyacinthe-Marie Cormier (1832–1916)
Rupert Mayer (1876–1945)
Ursula Ledóchowska (1865–1939)
Victoire Rasoamanarivo (1848–1894)

June 9, 1983
Domenico Mazzarella (1802–1854)
Eugenie Joubert (1876–1904)
Giovanni Bruni (1882–1897)
María Teresa Gonzalez-Quevedo Cadarso (1930–1950)

July 9, 1983
Blandine Merten (1883–1918)
Dorotea Chopitea Villota Serra (1816–1891)

September 24, 1983
Aimée-Adèle Le Bouteiller (1816–1883)
Marcelo Spinola y Maestre (1835–1906)
Peter Friedhofen (1819–1860)

1984

January 12, 1984
José María Rubio (1864–1929)
Nicolas Steno (1638–1686)

February 17, 1984
Giuseppe Nascimbeni (1851–1922)
Polycarpe Gondre (1801–1856)

April 7, 1984
Kuriakose Elias Chavara (1805–1871)
María del Carmen González-Ramos García-Prieto de Muñoz (1834–1899)
Virginia Centurione Bracelli (1587–1651)

June 9, 1984
Catherine of St. Augustine (1632–1668)
Jean-Bernard Rousseau (1797–1867)
Pierre-Joseph Cassant (1878–1903)

November 9, 1984
Alphonsa Muttathupadathu (1910–1946)

December 14, 1984
Franziska Nisch (1882–1913)

1985

March 21, 1985
Eustochia Smeralda Calafato (1434–1485)
Francinaina Cirer Carbonell (1781–1855)
Frédéric Janssoone (1838–1916)
Pierre-François Jamet (1762–1845)

May 9, 1985
Giuseppe Giaccardo (1896–1948)
Junípero Serra (1713–1784)

July 6, 1985
Benedetta Cambiagio Frassinello (1791–1858)
Miguel Mañara Vicenetelo de Leca Colona (1627–1679)
Pope Pius IX (1792–1878)
Teresa Grillo Michel (1855–1944)

November 16, 1985
Antonio Angelo Cavanis (1772–1858)
Giuseppe Bedetti (1799–1889)
Marco Antonio Cavanis (1774–1853)
Savina Petrilli (1851–1923)

1986

January 16, 1986
Giovanni Calabria (1873–1954)
José Gregorio Hernández (1864–1919)
Kaspar Stanggassinger (1871–1899)
Marie-Louise-Élisabeth de Lamoignon (1763–1825)

March 22, 1986
Alberto Marvelli (1918–1946)
Cayetana Alberta Giménez Adrover (1837–1922)
Edoardo Giuseppe Rosaz (1830–1903)
Giovanni Battista Piamarta(1841–1913)
Teresa of Los Andes (1900–1920)

June 5, 1986
Adèle de Batz de Trenquelléon (1789–1828)
Julian-Nicolas Rèche (1838–1890)
Laura Vicuña (1891–1904)
Maria Anna Rosa Caiani (1863–1921)

June 30, 1986
Edward Poppe (1890–1924)
Pietro Bonilli (1841–1935)

November 10, 1986
Agnelo de Souza (1869–1927)
Francisco Palau (1811–1872)

1987

January 3, 1987
Francisco de Paula Tarin Arnau (1847–1910)
Giuseppina Catanea (1894–1948)
Josefa Naval Girbés (1820–1893)
Philip Rinaldi (1856–1931)
Victor Scheppers (1802–1877)

January 26, 1987
Giuseppe Baldo (1843–1915)
Katharine Drexel (1858–1955)

March 16, 1987
Giovanni Battista Scalabrini (1839–1905)
Honorat Koźmiński (1829–1916)
María Pilar López de Maturana Ortiz de Zárate (1884–1934)
Eleonora Ramirez di Montalvo (1602–1659)

June 1, 1987
Cecilia Eusepi (1910–1928)

October 23, 1987
Angela Salawa (1881–1922)
Lucia Burlini (1710–1789)
Mariano Avellana (1844–1904)
Marie Deluil-Martiny (1841–1884)
Narcisa de Jesús (1832–1869)
Nazju Falzon (1813–1865)
Pier Giorgio Frassati (1901–1925)
Pierre Bonhomme (1806–1861)
Thomas Olera (1563–1631)

December 11, 1987
Benvenuto Bambozzi (1809–1875)
Bernardo Maria Clausi| (1789–1849)
Elisha Fracasso of Saint Clement (1901–1927)

1988

February 8, 1988
Francesco Chiesa (1874–1946)
Maria Elisabetta Renzi (1786–1859)
Lorenzo Maria of Saint Francis Xavier (1782–1856)
Mary Potter (1847–1913)
Pauline of the Agonizing Heart of Jesus (1865–1942)
Pierre Bienvenu Noailles (1793–1861)

March 28, 1988
Louise-Thérèse de Montaignac de Chauvance (1820–1885)
Maggiorino Vigolungo (1904–1918)

September 1, 1988
Dina Bosatta (1858–1887)
Emma Üffing (1914–1955)
Francesca Maria Rubatto (1844–1904)
Maddalena Caterina Morano (1847–1908)
Nazaria Ignacia March Mesa (1889–1943)

November 28, 1988
Joseph Savelberg (1827–1907)
Paula Montal Fornés (1799–1889)

1989

February 11, 1989
Agnes of Bohemia (1211–1282)

February 18, 1989
Elisabetta Vendramini (1790–1860)
Józef Sebastian Pelczar (1842–1924)
Maria Angela Picco (1867–1921)
Marie Theodore Voiron (1835–1925)
Paolo Manna (1872–1952)

May 13, 1989
Adolph Kolping (1813–1865)
Annunciata Astoria Cocchetti (1800–1882)
Dina Belanger (1897–1929)
Francisco Marto (1908–1919)
Giuseppe Allamano (1851–1926)
Jacinta Marto (1910–1920)
Jaume Clotet Fabres (1822–1898)
Joseph Vaz (1651–1711)
Maria Leonardo Ranixe (1796–1875)
María Natividad Venegas de la Torre (1868–1959)
Maria Schininà (1844–1910)

September 7, 1989
Balbino Sanchez Mayorga (1865–1934)
Carlo Sterpi (1874–1951)
Claudio Granzotto (1900–1947)
Filomena Ferrer Galcerán (1841–1868)
José Maria de Yermo y Parres (1851–1904)
María Josefa Sancho de Guerra (1842–1912)
Nazareno Santolini (1859–1930)
Nimatullah Kassab (1808–1858)
Rafael Arnáiz Barón (1911–1938)

December 21, 1989
Agostino Roscelli (1818–1902)
Annibale Maria di Francia (1851–1927)
Esteban Marcuello Zabalza (1808–1880)
Jacques Gianiel (1714–1750)
Johann Philipp Jeningen (1642–1704)
Kazimierz Wyszyński (1700–1755)
Leonardo Castellanos y Castellanos (1862–1912)
Marie-Thérèse Charlotte de Lamourous (1754–1836)

1990

March 3, 1990
Andrea Maria Borello (1916–1948)
Anne de Guigné (1911–1922)
Exupérien Mas (1829–1905)
Francesco Spinelli (1853–1913)
Gaetano Catanoso (1879–1963)
Mariano de Jesús Euse Hoyos (1845–1926)
Pietro Leonardi (1769–1844)
Saturnina Jassa Fontcuberta (1851–1936)
Teodoreto Garberoglio (1871–1954)

April 9, 1990
Antonio Vicenzo Gallo (1899–1934)
Catherine McAuley (1778–1841)
Josemaría Escrivá (1902–1975)
Juan Diego Cuauhtlatoatzin (1474–1548)
Ramon Ibarra González (1851–1925)

July 10, 1990
Colomba Matylda Gabriel (1858–1926)
Giuseppe Ambrosini (1889–1913)
Marguerite Bays (1815–1879)
Marie Louise Trichet (1684–1759)

1991

January 22, 1991
Alfano Vaser (1873–1943)
Antonio Augusto Intreccialagli (1852–1924)
Bolesława Lament (1862–1946)
Camille Costa de Beauregard (1841–1910)
Elena Aiello (1895–1961)
Gaetana Sterni (1827–1889)
Genoveva Torres Morales (1870–1956)
Giuseppe Oddi (1839–1919)
John Henry Newman (1801–1890)
Laura of Saint Catherine of Siena (1874–1949)
Maria Teresa Merlo (1894–1964)
Pietro Casani (1570–1647)
Vicente Bernedo (1562–1619)
Zefirino Agostini (1813–1896)

May 14, 1991
Alfred Pampalon (1867–1896)
Anne de Xainctonge (1567–1621)
Cesare Guasti (1822–1889)
Clara Fey (1815–1894)
Egidio Laurent (1884–1941)
Elisabetta Maria Satellico (1706–1745)
Gabriel Taborin (1799–1864)
Giuseppe Bartolomeo Menochio (1741–1823)
Giuseppe Giraldi (1848–1901)
Grimoaldo of the Purification (1883–1902)
Helena Stollenwerk (1852–1900)
Hendrina Stenmanns (1852–1903)
Jean-Baptiste Delaveyne (1653–1719)
Marie Anne Blondin (1809–1890)
Paolo Giuseppe Maria Frassinetti (1804–1868)

July 6, 1991
John Duns Scotus (1266–1308)
Émilie de Villeneuve (1811–1854)
Gianna Beretta Molla (1922–1962)
Marco d'Aviano (1631–1699)
María Rafols Bruna (1781–1853)

December 21, 1991
Alberto Hurtado (1901–1952)
Anita Cantieri (1910–1942)
Emmanuel d'Alzon (1810–1880)
Gerardo Sagarduy de Lasgoitia (1881–1962)
Jordan Mai (1866–1922)
Maria Bernarda Bütler (1848–1924)
Maria Lucrezia Zileri dal Verme (1839–1923)
Marie Poussepin (1653–1744)
Oreste Fontanella (1883–1935)
Vicenta Chávez Orozco (1867–1949)
Vincenzo Cimatti (1879–1965)

1992

March 7, 1992
Angelico Pittavino (1875–1953)
Faustina Kowalska (1905–1938)
Genoveffa De Troia (1887–1949)
Giuditta Vannini (1859–1911)
Jeanne Chezard de Matel (1596–1670)
Laura Evangelista Alvarado Cardozo (1875–1967)

June 13, 1992
Antonietta Farani (1906–1963)
Cornelia Connelly (1809–1879)
Giovanni Battista Rubino (1776–1853)
José María Amigó Ferrer (1854–1934)
Josep Torras i Bages (1846–1916)
María Teresa González Justo (1921–1967)
Mary MacKillop (1842–1909)
Monica Cornago Zapater (1889–1964)
Stanislaus Papczyński (1631–1701)

July 11, 1992
Fortunato De Gruttis (1826–1905)
László Batthyány-Strattmann (1870–1931)
Luigi Talamoni (1848–1926)
María Dolores Rodríguez Sopeña (1848–1918)
Théodore Guérin (1798–1856)

December 21, 1992
Agostino Chieppi (1830–1891)
Felix Mary Ghebreamlak (1895–1934)
Jan Beyzym (1850–1912)
Khalīl al-Haddād (1875–1954)
Nicolas Roland (1642–1678)
Stanisław Kazimierczyk (1433–1489)
Vittorio De Marino (1863–1929)

1993

April 2, 1993
Anna Maria Katherina Scherer (1825–1888)
Camila Rolón (1842–1913)
Daniel Coppini (1867–1945)
Edmund Ignatius Rice (1762–1844)
Francisco de Asís Méndez Casariego (1850–1924)
Luigi Variara (1875–1923)
Paola Renata Carboni (1908–1927)
Simaan Srugi (1877–1927)
Zygmunt Łoziński (1870–1932)

July 6, 1993
Candida Maria of Jesus (1845–1912)
Cesare Maria Barzaghi (1863–1941)
Frédéric Ozanam (1813–1853)
Giuseppe Pesci (1853–1929)
Maria Raffaella Cimatti (1861–1945)
Samuel Charles Mazzuchelli (1806–1864)

December 23, 1993
Benedetta Bianchi Porro (1936–1964)
Eleonora López de Maturana (1884–1931)
Emilia Chapellín Istúriz (1858–1893)
Émilie d'Oultremont d'Hoogvorst (1818–1878)
Émilie Gamelin (1800–1851)
Maria Antonia Paris (1813–1885)

1994

March 26, 1994
Alfredo Ildefonso Schuster (1880–1954)
Bernarda Heimgartner (1822–1863)
Daniel Comboni (1831–1881)
Felix Monasterio Ateca (1902–1951)
Giuseppina Gabriela Bonino (1843–1906)
José Gras Granollers (1834–1918)
José León Torres (1849–1930)
Julio María Matovelle (1852–1929)
Louis Martin (1823–1894)
Marie-Azélie Guérin Martin (1831–1877)
Maria Domenica Brun Barbantini (1789–1868)
María Isabel Tejada Cuartas (1887–1925)
Mary Theresa Dudzik (1860–1918)

July 2, 1994
Bronisław Markiewicz (1842–1912)
John of Dukla (1414–1484)
Lucia Mangano (1896–1946)
Luigi Caburlotto (1817–1897)
María Amparo Delgado García (1889–1941)
Maria Cristina of the Immaculate Conception (1856–1906)
Zdislava Berka (1220–1252)

December 15, 1994
Consuelo Utrilla Lozano (1925–1956)
Edel Quinn (1907–1944)
Gabriele Allegra (1907–1976)
Jan Wojciech Balicki (1869–1948)
Manuel Míguez González (1831–1925)
Maria Elena Bettini (1814–1894)
Marcelina Darowska (1827–1911)
Marie-Alphonsine Danil Ghattas (1843–1927)
Norberto Cassinelli (1827–1911)
Peregrina Mogas Fontcuberta (1827–1886)

1995

April 6, 1995
Anton Maria Schwartz (1852–1929)
Ferdinando Maria Baccilieri (1821–1893)
Gaetano Tantalo (1905–1947)
Giuseppe Tovini (1814–1897)
Gregor Cäsarius Buhl (1896–1973)
María Antonia Bandrés Elósegui (1898–1919)
Maria Vicenta Rosal (1820–1886)
Rudolf Komorek (1890–1949)

July 11, 1995
Anna Schäffer (1882–1925)
Cyprian Iwene Tansi (1903–1964)
Enrico Rebuschini (1860–1938)
Filippo Smaldone (1848–1923)
Franz Alexander Kern (1897–1924)
Germano Ruopollo (1850–1909)
Juan Collell Cuatrecasas (1864–1921)
Maria Chiara Magro (1923–1969)
Maria Karłowska (1865–1935)
Maria Giovanna Fasce (1881–1947)
Solanus Casey (1870–1957)

1996

January 12, 1996
Alexandrina Maria da Costa (1904–1955)
Alpert Mosch (1849–1898)
Bernardo de Hoyos (1711–1735)
Élisabeth Bergeron (1851–1936)
Flora Manfrinati (1906–1954)
Juan Vicente Zengotitabengoa Lausen (1862–1943)
María del Carmen González-Valerio (1930–1939)
Maria Klara Fietz (1905–1937)

May 13, 1996
Anton Martin Slomšek (1800–1862)

June 25, 1996
Antonio Amundarain Garmendia (1885–1954)
Elisa Angela Meneguzzi (1901–1941)
James Alberione (1884–1971)
Maria Teresa Lega (1812–1890)
Nicola da Gesturi (1882–1958)
Teresa Gallifa Palmarola (1850–1907)

December 17, 1996
Bernardyna Maria Jabłońska (1878–1940)
Carmen Salles y Barangueras (1848–1911)
Caterina Cittadini (1801–1857)
Eusebia Palomino Yenes (1899–1935)
Jadwiga of Poland (1374–1399)
María de las Maravillas de Jesús (1891–1974)
Pierre Toussaint (1766–1853)
Regina Protmann (1552–1613)
Teresa Mira García (1895–1941)

1997

March 8, 1997
Anthony of St. Ann Galvão (1739–1822)
Gioacchino Maria Stevan (1921–1949)
Giovanna Maria Bracaval (1861–1935)
Léon Dehon (1843–1925)
Louis-Antoine-Rose Ormières Lacase (1809–1890)
Maria Carmelina Leone (1923–1940)

July 7, 1997
Artémides Zatti (1880–1951)
Carla Ronci (1936–1970)
Carlos Manuel Rodríguez Santiago (1918–1963)
Egidio Bullesi (1905–1929)
Juana María Condesa Lluch (1862–1916)
Maria Teresa Casini (1864–1937)
Pierre Monnereau (1787–1856)

December 18, 1997
Ave Maria Pisano (1900–1964)
Delia Tetreault (1865–1941)
Giuseppe Picco (1867–1946)
Józef Bilczewski (1860–1923)
Justin Russolillo (1891–1955)
Pio of Pietrelcina (1887–1968)
Saturnina Rodríguez de Zavalía (1823–1896)
Secondo Pollo (1908–1941)
Thérèse of St. Augustine (1737–1787)
Tommaso Reggio (1818–1901)

1998

April 6, 1998
Alberto Capellan Zuazo (1888–1965)
Francesco Paleari (1863–1939)
François Gaschon (1732–1815)
Giovanni Maria Boccardo (1848–1913)
Josaphata Hordashevska (1869–1919)
Manuel González y García (1877–1940)
Maria Anna Donati (1848–1925)
Maria Gioia (1904|–1931)
Maria Güell Puig (1848–1921)
Paolo Pio Perazzo (1846–1911)

July 3, 1998
Edmund Bojanowski (1814–1871)
Elisabetta Girelli (1839–1919)
Kinga of Poland (1224–1292)
Maddalena Girelli (1838–1923)
María Dolores Medina Zepeda (1860–1925)
Maria Maddalena of the Holy Cross Alesci (1901–1929)
Rosa Ojeda Creus (1871–1954)

December 21, 1998
Anastasius Hartmann (1803–1866)
Arcangelo Tadini (1846–1912)
Firminius Wickenhauser (1876–1939)
Georges Bellanger (1861–1902)
Giacinto Longhin (1863–1936)
Jean Leon Le Prévost (1803–1874)
Josefa Campos Talamanes (1872–1950)
Maria Teresa Cortimiglia (1867–1934)
Rosa Maria Benedetta Gattorno Custo (1831–1900)

1999

March 26, 1999
Aureliano Landeta Azcueta (1887–1963)
Egidio Malacarne (1877–1953)
Elizabeth Hesselblad (1870–1957)
Isabel Larrañaga Ramirez (1836–1899)
Lino Maupas (1866–1924)

June 28, 1999
Columba Marmion (1858–1923)
George Preca (1880–1962)
Jeronimo Mariano Usera Alarcon (1810–1891)
María del Tránsito Cabanillas (1821–1855)
Maria Josefa Karolina Brader (1860–1943)
Maria Theresa Chiramel (1876–1926)
Mary of the Passion (1839–1904)
Pablo de Anda Padilla (1830–1904)

December 20, 1999
Concepcion Cabrera de Armida (1862–1937)
Elena Silvestri (1839–1907)
Pope John XXIII (1881–1963)
Zygmunt Gorazdowski (1845–1920)

2000

January 27, 2000
Francis Xavier Seelos (1819–1867)

July 1, 2000
Adrian Osmolowski (1838–1924)
Bonifacia Rodríguez y Castro (1837–1905)
Bruna Pellesi (1911–1972)
Carlo Liviero (1866–1932)
Carolina Santocanale (1852–1923)
Casimiro Barello Morello (1857–1884)
Eugenia Maria Ravasco (1845–1900)
Félix de Jesús Rougier (1859–1938)
Marcantonio Durando (1801–1880)
Maria Guadalupe Garcia Zavala (1878–1963)
María Luisa Josefa (1866–1937)
Tomasa Ortiz Real (1842–1916)

December 18, 2000
Giuseppe Ghezzi (1872–1955)
Janina Szymkowiak (1910–1942)
Librada Orozco Santa Cruz (1834–1926)
Maria Candida of the Eucharist (1884–1949)
Maria Pilar Izquierdo Albero (1906–1945)
Maria Romero Meneses (1902–1977)
Vendelin Vosnjak (1861–1933)

2001

April 24, 2001
Anne Catherine Emmerich (1774–1824)
Caterina Sordini (1770–1824)
Charles de Foucauld (1858–1916)
Concetta Bertoli (1908–1956)
Giovanni Antonio Farina (1803–1888)
Giuseppe Gualandi (1826–1907)
Luigi Monti (1825–1900)
Luigi Tezza (1841–1923)
Maria Adeodata Pisani (1806–1855)
Maria Domenica Mantovani (1862–1934)
Rosalie Rendu (1786–1856)
Tommaso Maria Fusco (1831–1891)
Zygmunt Szczęsny Feliński (1822–1895)

July 7, 2001
Luigi Beltrame Quattrocchi (1880–1951)
Maria Corsini Quattrocchi (1884–1965)

December 20, 2001
Antonina De Angelis (1880–1962)
Bruno Marchesini (1915–1938)
Juan Nepomuceno Zegrí Moreno (1831–1905)
Pedro Legaria Armendariz (1878–1956)

2002

April 23, 2002
Gioacchino La Lomia (1831–1905)
Giulia Salzano (1846–1929)
Giuseppe Morgera (1844–1898)
Matilde of the Sacred Heart (1841–1902)
Maria Anna Saltini Testi (1889–1957
Maria Josefa Alhama y Valera (1893–1983)

July 5, 2002
Euphrasia Eluvathingal (1877–1952)
Giulia Valle (1847–1916)
Maria Pia Mastena (1881–1951)
Marija Petković (1892–1966)
Ivan Merz (1896–1928)

December 20, 2002
Carlo Gnocchi (1902–1956)
Maria Teresa of St. Joseph (1855–1938)
Maria Crocifissa Curcio (1877–1957)
Teresa of Calcutta (1910–1997)

2003

April 12, 2003
Anna Maria Fiorelli Lapini (1809–1860)
Ascensión Nicol y Goñi (1868–1940)
Basil Moreau (1799–1873)
Charles I of Austria (1887–1922)
Eustáquio van Lieshout (1890–1943)
Filippo Bardellini (1878–1956)
Luigi Boccardo (1861–1936)
Luigi Bordino (1922–1977)
Mosè Tovini (1877–1930)

July 7, 2003
Clemens August Graf von Galen (1878–1946)
Costanza Starace (1845–1921)
Eurosia Fabris (1866–1932)
Pierre Vigne (1670–1740)

December 20, 2003
Angelo Calvi (1909–1937)
Luigi Biraghi (1801–1879)
Luigi Monza (1898–1954)
Maria Scrilli (1825–1889)
Maria Nazarena Majone (1869–1939)
Rita Amada de Jesus (1848–1913)

2004

April 19, 2004
Candlemas of San José (1863–1940)
Felice Prinetti (1842–1916)
Francesco Maria Greco (1857–1931)
Jose Gabriel del Rosario Brochero (1840–1914)
Maria Grazia Tarallo (1866–1912)
Marianne Cope (1838–1918)
María del Pilar Cimadevilla López-Dóriga (1952–1962)
Silvio Gallotti (1881–1927)
Teresa Guasch Toda (1848–1917)

June 28, 2004
Alfonsa Clerici (1860–1930)
Julia Navarette Guerrero (1881–1974)
María Angélica Pérez (1897–1932)
Pere Tarrés i Claret (1905–1950)
Thevarparampil Kunjachan (1891–1973)
Vittoria Gisella Gregoris (1873–1935)

December 20, 2004
Boļeslavs Sloskāns (1893–1981)
Ignacy Kłopotowski (1866–1931)
Luigi Maria Olivares (1873–1943)
Maria Merkert (1817–1872)
Mariano de la Mata (1905–1983)
Marta Anna Wiecka (1874–1904)
Michał Sopoćko (1888–1975)
Róża Filipa Białecka (1838–1887)
Titus Horten (1882–1936)
Virgilio Angioni (1878–1947)

See also
 List of people declared venerable by Pope John XXIII
 List of people declared venerable by Pope Paul VI
 List of people declared venerable by Pope Benedict XVI
 List of people declared venerable by Pope Francis

External links
Patron Saints Index

 
Venerable by Pope John Paul II